Akhmerovsky Forest is a forest in the northwestern part of Ishimbaysky District of Bashkortostan (Russia). It covers an area of 15 km² and is located approximately 18 km from Sterlitamak and 21 km from Ishimbay. 

The principal tree species in Akhmerovsky Forest are oak and lime.

See also 
 Barsky Forest

References

External links
 

Forests of Russia
Geography of Bashkortostan